Dumitru Alexandru (born 22 August 1953 in Bucharest) is a Romanian former rugby union player, who played as fly-half. Since 2000, he has been a talent scout and President of the Disciplinary Committee (until 2008) for F.F.R. and since 2014 a member of the Commission for the Status and Transfer of Players.

Club career
Alexandru played for RC Grivița, and then, for CSA Steaua București during his career.

International career
Alexandru first played for Romania in a match against Poland, on 14 March 1974, in Bucharest. He was also part of the 1987 Rugby World Cup squad, where he played two matches in the tournament. His last cap for Romania was against Italy, on 14 April 1990, in Frascati.

Honours
RC Grivița București
 Cupa României: 1972/73
CSA Steaua București 
 Divizia Națională: 1973/74, 1976/77, 1978/79, 1979/80, 1980/81, 1982/83, 1983/84, 1984/85, 1986/87, 1987/88, 1988/89
 Cupa României: 1973/74, 1976/77, 1977/78
Romania
 European Junior Rugby Championship: Rome 1972
 FIRA Trophy: 1974/75, 1976/77, 1980/81, 1982/83

See also
 List of Romania national rugby union players

References

External links

1953 births
Living people
Romanian rugby union players
Romania international rugby union players
CSA Steaua București (rugby union) players
Rugby union fly-halves
Rugby union players from Bucharest